Kaito Nakamura may refer to:

 Kaito Nakamura (Heroes), a character in the TV series Heroes
 Kaito Nakamura (actor) (born 1998), Japanese actor and model
 Kaito Nakamura (footballer) (born 2000), Japanese football midfielder